Isaak Konstantinovich (Kushelevich) Kikoin (28 March 1908 – 28 December 28, 1984), was a Soviet physicist of Lithuanian origin and an author of physics textbooks in Russian language who played an important role in the former Soviet program of nuclear weapons.

Biography

Kikoin was born in the town of Novye Zhagory (now Žagarė in Lithuania), Russian Empire. Kikoin was a Lithuanian Jew (orthodoxy) whose patronymic was also written as Kushelevich (Кушелевич; "son of Kushel"); and his parents were school teachers. During the World War I, his family was relocated from Latvia to Russia where he entered in gymnazium in Pskov, and upon graduation, he went to study physics at the Leningrad Polytechnic Institute in 1925.

In 1930-31, he earned his specialist degree in physics and successfully defended his thesis on Photomagnetism for his Doktor Nauk in 1936. He taught physics at the Leningrad Polytechnic Institute, and his early work investigated the electrical conductivity and magnetic attractions in metals until 1938. From 1938 till 1944, he taught physics at the Ural Polytechnic Institute and found a landmine project with the Red Army that would demagnetize, and detonate the German army's tanks. It was Kurchatov who brought Kikoin in Soviet program of nuclear weapons and assigned him the Uranium enrichment project at this Laboratory No. 2 using the gaseous diffusion method took place under Kikoin while Lev Artsimovich worked on electromagnetic isotope separation. During the Russian Alsos, he went to Germany to locate German knowledge that would proved useful in Soviet programs.

He remained associate with Soviet program of nuclear weapons, and was an academician of the Academy of Sciences of the Soviet Union and was awarded the Stalin Prize a total of four times (1942, 1949, 1951, 1953), the Lenin Prize in 1959, and the USSR State Prize in 1967 and 1980. Kikoin was named a Hero of Socialist Labour (1951); he also won the Kurchatov Medal (1971). Kikoin was with Igor Kurchatov as one of the founders of the Kurchatov Atomic Energy Institute, which developed the first Soviet nuclear reactor in 1946. This was the lead-in to the Soviet atomic bomb project with the first atomic bomb test taking place in 1949.

In 1970, Kikoin (jointly with Andrey Kolmogorov) started issuing Kvant magazine, a popular science magazine in physics and mathematics for school students and teachers. He authored texts on molecular physics in 1978, and it was has been translated in Persian language.

See also
Russian Alsos

References

External link 
I. K. Kikoin 

1908 births
1984 deaths
20th-century Russian physicists
People from Žagarė
People from Kovno Governorate
Communist Party of the Soviet Union members
Full Members of the USSR Academy of Sciences
Peter the Great St. Petersburg Polytechnic University alumni
Academic staff of Peter the Great St. Petersburg Polytechnic University
Heroes of Socialist Labour
Stalin Prize winners
Lenin Prize winners
Recipients of the Order of Lenin
Recipients of the Order of the Red Banner of Labour
Recipients of the Order of the Red Star
Recipients of the USSR State Prize
Nuclear weapons program of the Soviet Union
Jewish Russian physicists
Orthodox Jews
Lithuanian inventors
Lithuanian Jews
Lithuanian physicists
Russian inventors
Russian Jews
Russian physicists
Soviet inventors
Soviet Jews
Soviet physicists

Burials at Novodevichy Cemetery